Götterdämmerung ("Twilight of the Gods") is a tribute album to Die Ärzte. It was created and published in 1997 on the initiative of their fan club.

Track listing

CD1

CD2

Reception 
Michael Rensen describes the tribute album in the 126th issue of Rock Hard magazine as a disappointment. The recorded titles of the bands are powerless and lacking in ideas and overall he can't recommend the album.

References

Die Ärzte compilation albums
1997 compilation albums
Intercord albums
Tribute albums